The 1982 Houston Oilers season was the franchise’s 23rd overall and the 13th in the National Football League (NFL). After losing their season opener, the Oilers beat the Seattle Seahawks at the Astrodome 23–21. The Oilers were 1–1 before the two-month player's strike. When the season resumed the Oilers struggled, losing all seven games. Earl Campbell was held to just 536 yards, as the Oilers finished the season with a 1–8 record.

The last remaining active member of the 1982 Houston Oilers was offensive lineman Mike Munchak, who retired after the 1993 season.

Offseason

NFL draft

Personnel

Staff

Roster

Regular season

Schedule

Note: Intra-division opponents are in bold text.

Standings

References

External links
 1982 Houston Oilers at Pro-Football-Reference.com

Houston Oilers
Houston Oilers seasons
Houston